Katesepsawasdi Bhakdikul (born 17 October 1941) is a retired Thai army officer and athlete. He competed in the men's high jump at the 1964 Summer Olympics. He holds the rank of major general.

References

Katesepsawasdi Bhakdikul
Katesepsawasdi Bhakdikul
Katesepsawasdi Bhakdikul
Athletes (track and field) at the 1964 Summer Olympics
Place of birth missing (living people)
1941 births
Living people